The Social Labour Party (PST) was a political party in Brazil.

The PST was founded by dissidents of the Brazilian Labor Party in 1947. Abolished by the military regime in 1965, it was re-organized in 1988 before merging with another party to form the Progressive Party (PP) in 1993. It was finally recreated in 1996, and co-operated electorally with the small Liberal Party until 2003.

At the legislative elections held on 6 October 2002, the party won 3 out of 513 seats in the Chamber of Deputies and no seats in the Senate.

Labour parties
Political parties in Brazil
Political parties established in 1947
1947 establishments in Brazil
Political parties disestablished in 1965
1965 disestablishments in Brazil
Political parties established in 1988
1988 establishments in Brazil
Political parties disestablished in 1993
1993 disestablishments in Brazil
Political parties established in 1996
1966 establishments in Brazil
Political parties disestablished in 2003
2003 disestablishments in Brazil
Defunct political parties in Brazil